Renate Schimkoreit (born October 18, 1954) is a German diplomat. She was ambassador of Germany to Ghana (2012–2014) and now ambassador of Germany to Senegal since 2016 till date.

Background 
Renate Schimkoreit began studying political science, economics and Islamic studies in 1973, graduating in 1979 with a master 's degree from the Albert Ludwig University in Freiburg.

References 

Ambassadors to Ghana
German women ambassadors
1954 births
Living people
Ambassadors to Senegal
University of Freiburg alumni